Catherine Dauvergne was a former Vice-President, Academic and Provost of Simon Fraser University. Previously, she was Dean of the Peter A. Allard School of Law at the University of British Columbia from 2015 to 2020, and prior to this Dauvergne researched refugee, immigration, and citizenship law as a professor.

Career
Dauvergne studied law at the University of British Columbia (UBC) and clerked for Chief Justice Antonio Lamer.  She completed her PhD at the Australian National University and was a member of the Faculty of Law at the University of Sydney for four years before returning to Canada. From 2002 to 2012, Dauvergne held the Canada Research Chair in Migration Law at UBC. Dauvergne's 2008 book Making People Illegal: What Globalization Means for Migration and Law (Cambridge University Press) has been reprinted three times. She has also worked as a Pierre Elliott Trudeau Foundation Fellow.

Published works

 Making People Illegal: What Globalization Means for Migration and Law, Cambridge University Press, 2008. 
 Gendering Canada's Refugee Process, Status of Women Canada, 2006 (with co-authors Leonora Angeles and Agnes Huang) 
 Humanitarianism, Identity and Nation, UBC Press, 2005 
 Jurisprudence for an Interconnected Globe (edited by Catherine Dauvergne). Aldershot and Burlington: Ashgate, 2003.

References

External links
 In Search of Asylum, Frontier article

Year of birth missing (living people)
Living people
Canadian legal scholars
Canada Research Chairs
Academic staff of the University of British Columbia
Academic staff of the University of Sydney
Australian National University alumni
University of British Columbia alumni
Deans of law schools in Canada
Women deans (academic)